Ophisops jerdonii, commonly known as Jerdon's cabrita, Jerdon's snake-eye, or  Punjab snake-eyed lacerta, is a species of lacertid lizard, which is distributed in east Afghanistan, Pakistan, and India.

Etymology
The specific name, jerdonii, is in honor of British biologist Thomas C. Jerdon.

Description
Head moderate, feebly depressed. Upper head-shields rugose, keeled and striated; nostril lateral, pierced between 3 or 4 shields, viz. an anterior, or an upper and a lower anterior nasal and two superposed postnasals ; a large frontonasal; frequently one or two small azygos shields between the pair of prefrontals; four supraoculars, first and fourth small, the two principal separated from the supraciliaries by a series of granules; occipital small, sometimes a little broader than the interparietal, with which it forms a suture; subocular bordering the lip, between the fourth and fifth (or third and fourth) upper labials; temporal scales small, keeled; one or two large subtemporal shields border the parietals externally; tympanic shield small or indistinct. No gular fold extending from ear to ear; collar quite indistinct. Dorsal scales large, strongly keeled, much imbricate, scarcely larger on the back than on the sides; 28 to 35 scales round the middle of the body (ventrals included). A large postero-median preanal plate. The hind limb reaches the shoulder or halfway between the latter and the ear in the male, not to axilla in the female; 7 to 11 femoral pores on each side. Tail once and a half to twice as long as head and body; caudal scales about as large as dorsals. Coppery-brown above, with two pale golden lateral streaks bordered with black, the upper extending from the supraciliaries to the tail, the lower from the upper lip to the groin; frequently a series of large black spots between the two lateral streaks; lower surfaces yellowish white.

From snout to vent ; tail .

Central India (Saugor, Mhow), N.W. Provinces (Agra), Punjab, Sind, Madras Presidency (Bellary).

References

Further reading
Arnold EN (1989). "Towards a phylogeny and biogeography of the Lacertidae : relationships within an Old-World family of lizards derived from morphology". Bull. British Mus.(Nat. Hist.) Zool. 55 (2): 209–257.
Beddome RH (1870). "Descriptions of some new lizards from the Madras Presidency". Madras Monthly J. Med. Sci. 1: 30–35.
Blyth E (1854). "Notices and Descriptions of various Reptiles, new or little known [Part I]". J. Asiatic Soc. Bengal  22 [1853]: 639–655. ("Ophiops Jerdoni ", new species, p. 653).
Böhme W, Bischoff W (1991). "On the proper denomination of Cabrita jerdonii Beddome, 1870 (Reptilia: Lacertidae)". Amphibia-Reptilia 12: 220–221.
Das I (2002). A Photographic Guide to Snakes and other Reptiles of India. Sanibel Island, Florida: Ralph Curtis Books. 144 pp. . (Ophisops jerdoni, p. 103).
Das, Indraneil; Dattagupta, Basudeb (1997). "Rediscovery of the holotypes of Ophisops jerdoni Blyth, 1853 and Barkudia insularis Annandale, 1917". Hamadryad 22 (1): 53–55.
Jerdon TC (1870). "Notes on Indian Herpetology". Proc. Asiatic Soc. Bengal 1870 (March 1870): 66–85.

External links
 

Ophisops
Reptiles of Afghanistan
Reptiles of India
Reptiles of Pakistan
Taxa named by Edward Blyth
Reptiles described in 1853